New Hampshire Route 88 (abbreviated NH 88) is a  east–west state highway in Rockingham County in southeastern New Hampshire, United States. It runs from Hampton Falls to Exeter.

The western terminus of NH 88 is in Exeter at New Hampshire Route 108, though it is unsigned northwest of its intersection with New Hampshire Route 27 and New Hampshire Route 111 other than at the NH 108 intersection itself. The eastern terminus is in Hampton Falls at U.S. Route 1 (Lafayette Road).

Route description 

The highway heads southeast, roughly paralleling NH 101 for 1.1 miles before intersecting NH 27/NH 111 east of town. This westernmost stretch of NH 88 is very poorly signed; in fact NH 88 westbound to NH 108 is completely unsigned from NH 27/NH 111. Signage on NH 108 approaching this intersection is ambiguous as to whether Holland Way (the official name of this stretch) is part of NH 88, or simply an access road "To 88". NH 88 briefly (and silently) overlaps NH 27 and NH 111, then NH 88 splits off southeast again and crosses  into Hampton Falls.

Access to I-95 from NH 88 can be facilitated by either NH 107 in Seabrook or NH 101 in Hampton, both via US 1.

Junction list

References

External links

 New Hampshire State Route 88 on Flickr

088
Transportation in Rockingham County, New Hampshire